Radio Essex is an Independent Local Radio station broadcasting to Essex, England via DAB and Mid and South Essex via FM, from studios in The Icon Building on Southend seafront, owned by the Adventure Radio Group.

As of December 2022, the station broadcasts to a weekly audience of 108,000, according to RAJAR.

History

The station until 2015, consisted of two separate stations with separate names.

Chelmer FM began broadcasting on 107.7 FM in 1998, under the ownership of Mid Essex Radio Ltd. The station was re-branded twice, first in 2002 by the Tindle Radio Group as Dream 107.7 (in line with Dream 100, also owned by Tindle Radio), then again in 2009 by Adventure Radio as Chelmsford Radio.

Southend Radio began broadcasting on 105.1 FM in 2008. The station was awarded its licence to broadcast in October 2005, beating three rival bids.

The two radio stations began sharing programming from 2009. On 6 June 2013 the stations launched on DAB under the singular service Radio Essex.

On 23 March 2015 all three stations merged and relaunched as Radio Essex.

From August 2017, Radio Essex flipped format from AC to a Top 40 hit music format.

Programming
All programming on Radio Essex is broadcast from its studios in The Icon Building on Southend seafront, which also at times provides programming for other stations owned by Adventure Radio.

The station broadcasts local news bulletins from 6am to 7pm on weekdays, and between 8am and 11am at weekends.

Travel news is broadcast between 6am and 7pm on weekdays and provided live at key times from the Essex Traffic Control Centre at County Hall in Chelmsford. There are also travel bulletins at the weekend.

Technical 
Radio Essex broadcasts to Southend-on-Sea on 105.1 MHz from a transmitter located at the top of Maitland House in Southend High Street.

In Chelmsford and Mid Essex, Radio Essex can be received on 107.7 MHz. This is broadcast from a mobile phone mast at Church Green in the village Danbury.

Analogue (FM)

Digital (DAB)

See also 
 Adventure Radio
 Chelmsford Radio
 Southend Radio

References

 Radio Essex duo Martin and Su give sneak peek into their new show days before return to radio
 Radio Essex signs Scott Robinson from 5ive
 Chris Brooks appointed new PC at Radio Essex
 Martin and Su join Radio Essex
 Scott Robinson from 5ive to co-host Radio Essex show
 Radio Essex launches on DAB digital radio
 Radio Essex Schedule

External links
 Radio Essex
 Radio Today - Southend Radio Ready To Go
 Radio Today - Southend and Chelmsford Radio to merge

Radio stations in Essex
City of Chelmsford
Southend-on-Sea (town)
Radio stations established in 1998
Radio stations established in 2008